"Less Than an Hour (Theme from Rush Hour 3)" is a 2007 song by rapper Nas and singer Cee-Lo. It was first heard in the final credits of the film Rush Hour 3 on August 10, before being released on iTunes in September. It is featured on Nas' Greatest Hits album. It is produced by Salaam Remi, who arranged the track's rhythm section. Lalo Schifrin also received a writing credit for arranging the song's orchestra.

References

2007 singles
2007 songs
Nas songs
CeeLo Green songs
Sony BMG singles
Song recordings produced by Salaam Remi
Songs written by Salaam Remi
Songs written by CeeLo Green
Songs written by Nas